Rosemary Beresford (date of death unknown) was an American figure skater. In 1918, she won the U.S. Figure Skating Championships.

Competitive highlights

References

Year of birth missing
American female single skaters
Year of death missing
Place of birth missing
Place of death missing